Piane di Larino railway station (Italian: Stazione di Piane di Larino) is a former railway station on the Termoli-Campobasso line.

The station was closed on 15 December 2001 and continues to have an active level crossing.

Bibliography
La strada ferrata Termoli-Campobasso(Ripalimosani : Arti grafiche La Regione, 1992) Codice identificativo bibliotecario nazionale italiano IT\ICCU\CFI\0251972 
Azienda autonoma delle Ferrovie dello Stato FS Ordine di Servizio n. 76 del 1939
Rete Ferroviaria Italiana. Fascicolo Linea 138
 Impianti FS, in "I Treni" n. 234 (febbraio 2002), pp. 5–6.

External links

History and pictures of Molise railway stations 

This article is based upon a translation of the Italian language version as at May 2017.

Railway stations in Molise